Cantley Marshes is a  biological Site of Special Scientific Interest south-east of Norwich in Norfolk. It is managed by the Royal Society for the Protection of Birds, It is part of the Broadland Ramsar site and Special Protection Area, The Broads Special Area of Conservation and the Mid-Yare National Nature Reserve.

This site in the Yare valley is mainly species-rich grazing marsh with areas of wet alder carr and tall herb fen along the river bank. Invertebrates include two nationally rare dragonflies, and the marshes have several important breeding bird species and an internationally important population of wintering wigeon.

References

Sites of Special Scientific Interest in Norfolk